Suzanne Breen (born 1967) is an Irish journalist.

Career
Suzanne Breen, a native of Ulster, has been a journalist for several Irish newspapers including The Irish Times and The Belfast Telegraph.  She has also contributed to several Irish magazines such as Fortnight and Magill. She was the Northern Ireland editor for the Sunday Tribune. She has also written for Village Magazine on Northern Irish issues. In 2017 she was appointed Political Editor of the Belfast Telegraph.

Dispute over right to protect sources
She was contacted by the Real IRA when they claimed responsibility for the shootings at Massereene Barracks and admitted killing Denis Donaldson.<ref>Henry McDonald, "Irish journalist says she will not disclose Real IRA sources", The Guardian, 12 May 2009; retrieved 12 May 2009.</ref>Suzanne Breen, "Massereene Murders Sets North Back Years" , Tribune News, 12 April 2009; retrieved 12 May 2009

In 2009, she was approached by the Police Service of Northern Ireland and asked to hand over details about sources, which she refused to do.Suzanne Breen, I'm not going to put my life in danger to do the PSNI's job , Tribune News, 3 May 2009; retrieved 12 May 2009. She was supported by the National Union of Journalists and the Sunday Tribune''. Breen stated that her life could be in danger if she reveals her sources.

Initially, the judge said he was minded to grant the order to the PSNI, but, in June 2009, the High Court in Belfast ruled in her favour, saying she did not have to hand over her notes. She had been told by a third party that if she handed over her notes, she and her family would be in danger from the Real IRA.

Awards
 Northern Ireland Journalist of the Year (1994)
 Northern Ireland Feature Journalist of the Year (1995, 1996, 1997, 2010, 2016).
 Outstanding journalism by women on the island of Ireland (1999).

References

Journalists from Northern Ireland
Place of birth missing (living people)
Living people
20th-century Irish people
21st-century Irish people
Columnists from Northern Ireland
1967 births